Jonathan Skjöldebrand (born August 2, 1983) is a former Swedish-Israeli professional basketball player.

Early life
Skjöldebrand was born in Amirim, Israel to Swedish parents, he played for Hapoel Sasa and Hapoel Galil Elyon youth teams. His dad is a Swedish Jew and his mom is a non-Jewish Swede.

Professional career
On August 28, 2011, Skjöldebrand signed with Hapoel Tel Aviv. In his first season with Hapoel, they were promoted to the Israeli Premier League.

On December 2, 2012, Skjöldebrand filed verbal abuse against Guy Pnini who used curse words and racial comments towards him during a game between Hapoel and Maccabi Tel Aviv.

On July 1, 2013, Skjöldebrand signed a two-year contract extension with Hapoel Tel Aviv.

On August 31, 2015, Skjöldebrand parted ways with Hapoel and signed a one-year contract with Maccabi Ashdod. On February 7, 2016, Skjöldebrand recorded a career-high 28 points, shooting 8-of-8 from three-point range, along with five rebounds and three assists in an 84–88 loss to Maccabi Kiryat Gat. Skjöldebrand helped Ashdod reach the 2016 Israeli State Cup Final where they eventually lost to Maccabi Tel Aviv.

On June 30, 2016, Skjöldebrand signed with Ironi Nahariya for the 2016–17 season. On April 18, 2017, Skjöldebrand participated in the 2017 Israeli All-Star Game and the Three-point shootout during the same event. Skjöldebrand helped Nahariya reach the 2017 FIBA Europe Cup Quarterfinals and the 2017 Israeli League Playoffs. On June 9, 2017, Skjöldebrand was named 2017 All-Israeli League Second Team.

On July 11, 2017, Skjöldebrand signed a two-year contract extension with Nahariya. On September 9, 2017, Skjöldebrand was named Nahariya's team captain. In 33 games played during the 2017–18 season, Skjöldebrand averaged 10.1 points, 3.4 rebounds and 1.4 assists, shooting 48.4 percent from three-point range.

On July 4, 2018, Skjöldebrand signed with Hapoel Eilat for the 2018–19 season. On May 16, 2019, Skjöldebrand scored a three-pointer at the buzzer to give Eilat a 74–73 win over Bnei Herzliya, sending Herzliya to the Israeli National League. Skjöldebrand helped Eilat reach the 2019 Israeli League Final Four, where they eventually lost to Maccabi Tel Aviv in the Semifinals.

On August 27, 2019, Skjöldebrand signed a two-year contract extension with Eilat.

On August 14, 2021, he has signed with Hapoel Tel Aviv of the Israeli Premier League.

Swedish national team
Skjöldebrand was a member of the Swedish national team at EuroBasket 2013.

Personal life
His father, Lorentz Skjöldebrand, is a Swedish former basketball player who played in Israel.

References

External links
 RealGM profile

1983 births
Living people
CB Axarquía players
Hapoel Eilat basketball players
Hapoel Galil Elyon players
Hapoel Haifa B.C. players
Hapoel Tel Aviv B.C. players
Israeli men's basketball players
Israeli people of Swedish-Jewish descent
Ironi Nahariya players
Kouvot players
Maccabi Ashdod B.C. players
Melilla Baloncesto players
Power forwards (basketball)
Södertälje Kings players
Swedish expatriate basketball people in Spain
Swedish men's basketball players
Swedish expatriate sportspeople in Israel
Swedish Jews